Gordon Haynes (21 December 1928-4 July 2015) is a former professional rugby league footballer who played in the 1950s and 1960s.

Background
Gordon Haynes was born in Warrington, Lancashire, England. He played amateur rugby league for Latchford Albion before signing for Swinton.

International honours
Gordon Haynes represented Great Britain while at Swinton in April 1956 against France (non-Test match) at Odsal Stadium, Bradford. Great Britain won 18-10 in front of a crowd of 10,453. 

Along with William "Billy" Banks, Edward "Ted" Cahill, Keith Holliday, William "Billy" Ivison, Robert "Bob" Kelly, John McKeown, George Parsons and Edward "Ted" Slevin, Gordon Haynes' only Great Britain appearance came against France prior to 1957, these matches were not considered as Test matches by the Rugby Football League, and consequently caps were not awarded.

References

External links
!Great Britain Statistics at englandrl.co.uk (statistics currently missing due to not having appeared for both Great Britain, and England)
Statistics at orl-heritagetrust.org.uk 

1928 births
2015 deaths
English rugby league players
Great Britain national rugby league team players
Oldham R.L.F.C. players
Rugby league locks
Rugby league players from Warrington
Swinton Lions players